Booker T. Washington Public Charter School was a 501c3 non-profit charter high school chartered by the District of Columbia Public Schools.It operated from 1999 to 2014

The Booker T. Washington Public Charter School opened for the 1999-2000 school year at 1346 Florida Avenue, NW. It was an academically-oriented vocational school with a mission to educate students in grades 9-12, as well as adults,
for construction and building trades. When its 15-year charter was set to expire, it submitted an application for renewal, but in February 2014 the DC Public Charter School Board voted 5-0-1 to deny the renewal. " PCSB reviewed the school’s application and found that the school failed to meet its charter goals and academic achievement expectations." The charter expired June 30, 2014.

See also
Education in the United States
List of things named after Booker T. Washington

References

External links
Booker T. Washington Public Charter Schools Home Page

Educational institutions established in 1999
1999 establishments in Washington, D.C.
District of Columbia Public Schools
Charter schools in the District of Columbia
Public high schools in Washington, D.C.
Educational institutions disestablished in 2014
2014 disestablishments in Washington, D.C.